Charlotte Fitch Roberts (February 13, 1859 – December 5, 1917) was an American chemist best known for her work on stereochemistry.

Life
Roberts was born on February 13, 1859, in New York City to Horace Roberts and Mary Roberts (née Hart).

Education and career 
Roberts attended Wellesley College in 1880. Wellesley made her a graduate assistant in 1881, an instructor in 1882, and an associate professor in 1886. In 1885 she spent a year at Cambridge University working with Sir James Dewar, a chemist and physicist. In 1896 she published The Development and Present Aspects of Stereochemistry. She obtained a PhD from Yale in 1894 and a post at the University of Berlin from 1899 to 1900. She was made a professor and the head of the chemistry department from 1896 to 1917 at Wellesley College.

Awards and professional bodies 
Roberts was made a fellow of the American Association for the Advancement of Science, and a chemistry professorship at Wellesley now bears her name.

References

External links

1859 births
1917 deaths
Scientists from New York City
American women chemists
Stereochemists
20th-century American chemists
19th-century American chemists
Wellesley College alumni
Yale University alumni
Wellesley College faculty
Fellows of the American Association for the Advancement of Science